Two-dimensional nuclear magnetic resonance spectroscopy (2D NMR) is a set of nuclear magnetic resonance spectroscopy (NMR) methods which give data plotted in a space defined by two frequency axes rather than one. Types of 2D NMR include correlation spectroscopy (COSY), J-spectroscopy, exchange spectroscopy (EXSY), and nuclear Overhauser effect spectroscopy (NOESY).  Two-dimensional NMR spectra provide more information about a molecule than one-dimensional NMR spectra and are especially useful in determining the structure of a molecule, particularly for molecules that are too complicated to work with using one-dimensional NMR.

The first two-dimensional experiment, COSY, was proposed by Jean Jeener, a professor at the Université Libre de Bruxelles, in 1971.  This experiment was later implemented by Walter P. Aue, Enrico Bartholdi and Richard R. Ernst, who published their work in 1976.

Fundamental concepts 
Each experiment consists of a sequence of radio frequency (RF) pulses with delay periods in between them.  The timing, frequencies, and intensities of these pulses distinguish different NMR experiments from one another.  Almost all two-dimensional experiments have four stages: the preparation period, where a magnetization coherence is created through a set of RF pulses; the evolution period, a determined length of time during which no pulses are delivered and the nuclear spins are allowed to freely precess (rotate); the mixing period, where the coherence is manipulated by another series of pulses into a state which will give an observable signal; and the detection period, in which the free induction decay signal from the sample is observed as a function of time, in a manner identical to one-dimensional FT-NMR.

The two dimensions of a two-dimensional NMR experiment are two frequency axes representing a chemical shift.  Each frequency axis is associated with one of the two time variables, which are the length of the evolution period (the evolution time) and the time elapsed during the detection period (the detection time).  They are each converted from a time series to a frequency series through a two-dimensional Fourier transform.  A single two-dimensional experiment is generated as a series of one-dimensional experiments, with a different specific evolution time in successive experiments, with the entire duration of the detection period recorded in each experiment.

The end result is a plot showing an intensity value for each pair of frequency variables.  The intensities of the peaks in the spectrum can be represented using a third dimension.  More commonly, intensity is indicated using contour lines or different colors.

Homonuclear through-bond correlation methods 

In these methods, magnetization transfer occurs between nuclei of the same type, through J-coupling of nuclei connected by up to a few bonds.

Correlation spectroscopy (COSY) 

The first and most popular two-dimension NMR experiment is the homonuclear correlation spectroscopy (COSY) sequence, which is used to identify spins which are coupled to each other.  It consists of a single RF pulse (p1) followed by the specific evolution time (t1) followed by a second pulse (p2) followed by a measurement period (t2).

The two-dimensional spectrum that results from the COSY experiment shows the frequencies for a single isotope, most commonly hydrogen (1H) along both axes.  (Techniques have also been devised for generating heteronuclear correlation spectra, in which the two axes correspond to different isotopes, such as 13C and 1H.)   Diagonal peaks correspond to the peaks in a 1D-NMR experiment, while the cross peaks indicate couplings between pairs of nuclei (much as multiplet splitting indicates couplings in 1D-NMR).

Cross peaks result from a phenomenon called magnetization transfer, and their presence indicates that two nuclei are coupled which have the two different chemical shifts that make up the cross peak's coordinates.  Each coupling gives two symmetrical cross peaks above and below the diagonal.  That is, a cross-peak occurs when there is a correlation between the signals of the spectrum along each of the two axes at these values. 
An easy visual way to determine which couplings a cross peak represents is to find the diagonal peak which is directly above or below the cross peak, and the other diagonal peak which is directly to the left or right of the cross peak.  The nuclei represented by those two diagonal peaks are coupled.

COSY-90 is the most common COSY experiment.  In COSY-90, the p1 pulse tilts the nuclear spin by 90°. Another member of the COSY family is COSY-45.  In COSY-45 a 45° pulse is used instead of a 90° pulse for the second pulse, p2.  The advantage of a COSY-45 is that the diagonal-peaks are less pronounced, making it simpler to match cross-peaks near the diagonal in a large molecule.  Additionally, the relative signs of the coupling constants (see J-coupling#Magnitude of J-coupling) can be elucidated from a COSY-45 spectrum.  This is not possible using COSY-90.  Overall, the COSY-45 offers a cleaner spectrum while the COSY-90 is more sensitive.

Another related COSY technique is double quantum filtered (DQF) COSY.  DQF COSY uses a coherence selection method such as phase cycling or pulsed field gradients, which cause only signals from double-quantum coherences to give an observable signal.  This has the effect of decreasing the intensity of the diagonal peaks and changing their lineshape from a broad "dispersion" lineshape to a sharper "absorption" lineshape.  It also eliminates diagonal peaks from uncoupled nuclei.  These all have the advantage that they give a cleaner spectrum in which the diagonal peaks are prevented from obscuring the cross peaks, which are weaker in a regular COSY spectrum.

Exclusive correlation spectroscopy (ECOSY)

Total correlation spectroscopy (TOCSY) 

The TOCSY experiment is similar to the COSY experiment, in that cross peaks of coupled protons are observed.  However, cross peaks are observed not only for nuclei which are directly coupled, but also between nuclei which are connected by a chain of couplings.  This makes it useful for identifying the larger interconnected networks of spin couplings.  This ability is achieved by inserting a repetitive series of pulses which cause isotropic mixing during the mixing period.  Longer isotropic mixing times cause the polarization to spread out through an increasing number of bonds.

In the case of oligosaccharides, each sugar residue is an isolated spin system, so it is possible to differentiate all the protons of a specific sugar residue. A 1D version of TOCSY is also available, and by irradiating a single proton the rest of the spin system can be revealed.  Recent advances in this technique include the 1D-CSSF (chemical shift selective filter) TOCSY experiment, which produces higher quality spectra and allows coupling constants to be reliably extracted and used to help determine stereochemistry.

TOCSY is sometimes called "homonuclear Hartmann–Hahn spectroscopy" (HOHAHA).

Incredible natural-abundance double-quantum transfer experiment (INADEQUATE) 

INADEQUATE is a method often used to find 13C couplings between adjacent carbon atoms.  Because the natural abundance of 13C is only about 1%, only about 0.01% of molecules being studied will have the two nearby 13C atoms needed for a signal in this experiment.  However, correlation selection methods are used (similarly to DQF COSY) to prevent signals from single 13C atoms, so that the double 13C signals can be easily resolved.  Each coupled pair of nuclei gives a pair of peaks on the INADEQUATE spectrum which both have the same vertical coordinate, which is the sum of the chemical shifts of the nuclei; the horizontal coordinate of each peak is the chemical shift for each of the nuclei separately.

Heteronuclear through-bond correlation methods 

Heteronuclear correlation spectroscopy gives signal based upon coupling between nuclei of two different types.  Often the two nuclei are protons and another nucleus (called a "heteronucleus").  For historical reasons, experiments which record the proton rather than the heteronucleus spectrum during the detection period are called "inverse" experiments.  This is because the low natural abundance of most heteronuclei would result in the proton spectrum being overwhelmed with signals from molecules with no active heteronuclei, making it useless for observing the desired, coupled signals.  With the advent of techniques for suppressing these undesired signals, inverse correlation experiments such as HSQC, HMQC, and HMBC are actually much more common today.  "Normal" heteronuclear correlation spectroscopy, in which the hetronucleus spectrum is recorded, is known as HETCOR.

Heteronuclear single-quantum correlation spectroscopy (HSQC)

HSQC detects correlations between nuclei of two different types which are separated by one bond.  This method gives one peak per pair of coupled nuclei, whose two coordinates are the chemical shifts of the two coupled atoms.

HSQC works by transferring magnetization from the I nucleus (usually the proton) to the S nucleus (usually the heteroatom) using the INEPT pulse sequence; this first step is done because the proton has a greater equilibrium magnetization and thus this step creates a stronger signal.  The magnetization then evolves and then is transferred back to the I nucleus for observation.  An extra spin echo step can then optionally be used to decouple the signal, simplifying the spectrum by collapsing multiplets to a single peak.  The undesired uncoupled signals are removed by running the experiment twice with the phase of one specific pulse reversed; this reverses the signs of the desired but not the undesired peaks, so subtracting the two spectra will give only the desired peaks.

Heteronuclear multiple-quantum correlation spectroscopy (HMQC) gives an identical spectrum as HSQC, but using a different method.  The two methods give similar quality results for small to medium-sized molecules, but HSQC is considered to be superior for larger molecules.

Heteronuclear multiple-bond correlation spectroscopy (HMBC)
HMBC detects heteronuclear correlations over longer ranges of about 2–4 bonds.  The difficulty of detecting multiple-bond correlations is that the HSQC and HMQC sequences contain a specific delay time between pulses which allows detection only of a range around a specific coupling constant.  This is not a problem for the single-bond methods since the coupling constants tend to lie in a narrow range, but multiple-bond coupling constants cover a much wider range and cannot all be captured in a single HSQC or HMQC experiment.

In HMBC, this difficulty is overcome by omitting one of these delays from an HMQC sequence.  This increases the range of coupling constants that can be detected, and also reduces signal loss from relaxation.  The cost is that this eliminates the possibility of decoupling the spectrum, and introduces phase distortions into the signal.  There is a modification of the HMBC method which suppresses one-bond signals, leaving only the multiple-bond signals.

Through-space correlation methods 
These methods establish correlations between nuclei which are physically close to each other regardless of whether there is a bond between them.  They use the nuclear Overhauser effect (NOE) by which nearby atoms (within about 5 Å) undergo cross relaxation by a mechanism related to spin–lattice relaxation.

Nuclear Overhauser effect spectroscopy (NOESY) 
In NOESY, the nuclear Overhauser cross relaxation between nuclear spins during the mixing period is used to establish the correlations.  The spectrum obtained is similar to COSY, with diagonal peaks and cross peaks, however the cross peaks connect resonances from nuclei that are spatially close rather than those that are through-bond coupled to each other.  NOESY spectra also contain extra axial peaks which do not provide extra information and can be eliminated through a different experiment by reversing the phase of the first pulse.

One application of NOESY is in the study of large biomolecules, such as in protein NMR, in which relationships can often be assigned using sequential walking.

The NOESY experiment can also be performed in a one-dimensional fashion by pre-selecting individual resonances. The spectra are read with the pre-selected nuclei giving a large, negative signal while neighboring nuclei are identified by weaker, positive signals.  This only reveals which peaks have measurable NOEs to the resonance of interest but takes much less time than the full 2D experiment.  In addition, if a pre-selected nucleus changes environment within the time scale of the experiment, multiple negative signals may be observed.  This offers exchange information similar to the EXSY (exchange spectroscopy) NMR method.

NOESY experiments are important tool to identify stereochemistry of a molecule in solvent whereas single crystal XRD used to identify stereochemistry of a molecule in solid form.

Heteronuclear Overhauser effect spectroscopy (HOESY) 
In HOESY, much like NOESY is used for the cross relaxation between nuclear spins. However, HOESY can offer information about other NMR active nuclei in a spatially relevant manner. Examples include any nuclei X{Y} or X→Y such as 1H→13C, 19F→13C, 31P→13C, or 77Se→13C. The experiments typically observe NOEs from protons on X, X{1H}, but do not have to include protons.

Rotating-frame nuclear Overhauser effect spectroscopy (ROESY) 
ROESY is similar to NOESY, except that the initial state is different.  Instead of observing cross relaxation from an initial state of z-magnetization, the equilibrium magnetization is rotated onto the x axis and then spin-locked by an external magnetic field so that it cannot precess.  This method is useful for certain molecules whose rotational correlation time falls in a range where the nuclear Overhauser effect is too weak to be detectable, usually molecules with a molecular weight around 1000 daltons, because ROESY has a different dependence between the correlation time and the cross-relaxation rate constant.  In NOESY the cross-relaxation rate constant goes from positive to negative as the correlation time increases, giving a range where it is near zero, whereas in ROESY the cross-relaxation rate constant is always positive.

ROESY is sometimes called "cross relaxation appropriate for minimolecules emulated by locked spins" (CAMELSPIN).

Resolved-spectrum methods 
Unlike correlated spectra, resolved spectra spread the peaks in a 1D-NMR experiment into two dimensions without adding any extra peaks.  These methods are usually called J-resolved spectroscopy, but are sometimes also known as chemical shift resolved spectroscopy or δ-resolved spectroscopy.  They are useful for analysing molecules for which the 1D-NMR spectra contain overlapping multiplets as the J-resolved spectrum vertically displaces the multiplet from each nucleus by a different amount.  Each peak in the 2D spectrum will have the same horizontal coordinate that it has in a non-decoupled 1D spectrum, but its vertical coordinate will be the chemical shift of the single peak that the nucleus has in a decoupled 1D spectrum.

For the heteronuclear version, the simplest pulse sequence used is called a Müller–Kumar–Ernst (MKE) experiment, which has a single 90° pulse for the heteronucleus for the preparation period, no mixing period, and applies a decoupling signal to the proton during the detection period.  There are several variants on this pulse sequence  which are more sensitive and more accurate, which fall under the categories of gated decoupler methods and spin-flip methods.  Homonuclear J-resolved spectroscopy uses the spin echo pulse sequence.

Higher-dimensional methods

3D and 4D experiments can also be done, sometimes by running the pulse sequences from two or three 2D experiments in series.  Many of the commonly used 3D experiments, however, are triple resonance experiments; examples include the HNCA and HNCOCA experiments, which are often used in protein NMR.

See also 
Two-dimensional correlation analysis

References 

Nuclear magnetic resonance spectroscopy